Richard Roe (22 January 1913 – 4 May 2008) was an Australian cricketer who played two first-class matches for Western Australia in 1935. On debut against New South Wales, he made 35 runs in the first innings, batting at number four, before being run out. He made 29 runs in the second innings. In his second match, also against New South Wales, he made 58 runs in the first innings, his highest score. He also played one match for the Australian Capital Territory in 1940 against Illawarra, although it did not have first-class status. He died in 2008 at the age of 95.

References

1913 births
2008 deaths
Australian cricketers
Sportspeople from Geraldton
Western Australia cricketers
Cricketers from Western Australia